ZBC TV, also known as ZTV, is Zimbabwe's public free to air television network that is fully owned and operated by the state broadcaster.

History
In the country, television was introduced on 15 November 1960, making it the second country after Nigeria to launch such services in the Sub Saharan Africa and the first in Southern Africa. It was operated by a private company called Rhodesian Television (RTV) with its major shareholders being South African companies.

RTV was taken over by the government and became part of the then state broadcaster, Rhodesian Broadcasting Corporation (RBC) in 1976.

Television was mainly accessible in major cities of the country and mostly to the white population. At the time of launch on 15 November 1960, television became available in Salisbury (now Harare) and in June 1961 it became available in Bulawayo. Back then, the station was broadcasting in black and white until 1982, when it upgraded to full colour using PAL B system.

After the country's independence on 18 April 1980, RTV became ZBC TV and RBC became ZBC. This followed after the country changed its name from Rhodesia, Southern Rhodesia, Zimbabwe Rhodesia to Independent Zimbabwe. The station is sometimes called ZTV, abbreviation for Zimbabwe Television, a name that was officially used in the 2000s.

In the late 90s, the country's main opposition party MDC led by Morgan Tsvangirai was launched.  This saw the majority of the opposition supporters, local independent media houses, non governmental organisations and international media monitors accusing the state broadcaster for only reporting biased news favouring the ruling ZANU PF.

Other TV stations
In July 1998, Joy TV, a private TV station was launched in the capital, but was later closed down on 31 May 2002  when ZBC refused to renew its licence. In December 2018, ZBC announced the return of Joy TV.

In 2004, ZBC announced a new TV channel called National Television or NTV, a brainchild of the then information minister, Jonathan Moyo and was said that it will be broadcasting from Montrose Studios in Bulawayo. The launch of the station was delayed despite the fact that the transmitter was already installed. In 2005, Minister Moyo was fired and the project collapsed. In 2015 when he was reappointed as the information minister, Moyo promised to revive the NTV project but that never happened.

On 1 May 2010, ZBC reported the successful launch of another TV channel called Channel 2. The TV channel transmitted on 199.5 MHz within an 80 km (50 mile) radius of Harare. The station was later closed in 2015.

On 20 November 2020, The Broadcasting Authority of Zimbabwe (BAZ) granted free to air commercial television licences to 6 (out of the 14 applicants) private players to broadcast nationally, breaking the 60 year long ZBC TV monopoly. These include the Bulawayo-based FairTalk Communications, trading as Ke Yona TV which owns Bulawayo's Skyz Metro FM and Victoria Falls' Breeze FM. The state owned ZimPapers Limited, trading as ZTN (ZimPapers Television Network), which owns several radio stations and print media in the country was also granted. Other players include Rusununguko Media (Pvt) Ltd trading as NRTV, Jester Media trading as 3K TV, Acacia Media Group trading as Kumba TV and Channel Dzimbahwe trading as Channel D.

Unsuccessful applicants include ZiFM Stereo's parent company AB Communications trading as Flex TV, Alpha Media Holdings' Heart & Soul Broadcasting Services (Pvt) Ltd trading as HStv, Blackbury Enterprises (Pvt) Ltd trading as Blackbury TV, Conduit Investments (Pvt) Ltd trading as Conduit TV Station, Just in Time TV (Pvt) Ltd trading as JIT TV, Medianet Productions (Pvt) Ltd trading as Sunrise TV and Meditation Investments (Pvt) Ltd trading Zim news Channel.

Programming

General entertainment and news

75% of the broadcast content is locally produced. International and regional content from the neighbouring South Africa, USA, UK, Australia, and Korea is also available.

The news covered are mainly local and partly regional and international. News Hour is the hour-long news bulletin that is broadcast daily from 8 PM. Nhau / Indaba is another news bulletin that is split between Shona (Nhau) and Ndebele (Indaba) with each receiving 30 minutes time slot. Good Morning Zimbabwe is the daily morning news bulletin then there is also Lunch Time News.

Other popular TV shows include the Ezomgido, a local and regional musical show, Coke on the Beat which is a pop musical show, Studio 263, the country's first soap opera and other various local shows including current affairs and gospel shows.

Iconic locally produced content include;
Mukadota
Ezomgido
Stitsha
Kukhulwa Kokuphela
Tiriparwendo
Studio 263
Amakorokoza
Sinjalo
Timmy naBonzo
Gringo

Sports

The station also broadcasts various live sports tournaments from around the country and some major tournaments around the world, including the FIFA World Cup, Olympics and the Africa Cup of Nations (AFCON).

Due to lack of finances which is believed to be caused by poor management and the corrupt board, the station is struggling to broadcast locally loved sport events like the Premier League, UEFA Champions League and many others.

Many local viewers are complaining about the station's poor broadcasting standard and are ditching it for foreign content distributors like Netflix and DStv.

Programmes

Imported Programmes

Current

Children's programming
Dino Dan
Raggs

Animated
The Adventures of Chuck and Friends
Ben 10: Omniverse
Biker Mice from Mars
Curious George
Jake and the Never Land Pirates
Legend of Enyo
My Little Pony: Friendship Is Magic
Pac-Man and the Ghostly Adventures
The Penguins of Madagascar
Poppy Cat
Rocket Monkeys
Sid the Science Kid
Sofia the First
Teenage Mutant Ninja Turtles
Transformers: Prime
Totally Spies!
Ultimate Spider-Man

Comedy
All of Us
The Big Bang Theory
Friends
Girlfriends
Just Shoot Me!
Reed Between the Lines
Seinfeld
That '70s Show

Drama
Alias
Alphas
Angel
Heroes
Miracles
Scandal
Smallville
Supernatural

Education
MythBusters

Documentary
Green Planet
I Shouldn't Be Alive
Mayday

Cooking
The Mind of a Chef

Former

Children's programming
The Adventures of Rin Tin Tin
Art Attack
Bananas in Pyjamas
Barney & Friends
Brum
Button Moon
Captain Power and the Soldiers of the Future
Catch Kandy
The Enid Blyton Adventure Series
The Fabulous Reggae Dogs
The Famous Five
The Famous Five
Five Children and It
Fun House
Ghostwriter
Go Go Giggles
The Great Space Coaster
Halfway Across the Galaxy and Turn Left
iCarly
Incredible Story Studio
Jam
Jim Henson's Animal Show
Johnson and Friends
K.C. Undercover
Kids Incorporated
The Kids of Degrassi Street
Lamb Chop's Play Along
Lassie
Magic Letters
Masters of the Maze
Mighty Morphin Power Rangers
The Miraculous Mellops
Mirror, Mirror
Ocean Girl
The Odyssey
Pigasso's Place
Pugwall
Pugwall's Summer
The Puzzle Place
Rainbow
Richard the Lionheart
Rosie and Jim
Round the Twist
Sam & Cat
Saturdee
Sesame Street
Shake It Up
Skippy the Bush Kangaroo
Streetwise
That's So Raven
Teletubbies
The Tribe
Tweenies
T-Bag
Victorious
Wail of the Banshee
Wizadora
Wizards Of Waverly Place
Worzel Gummidge
Xuxa

Animated
3-2-1 Penguins!
The Addams Family
The Adventures of Blinky Bill
The Adventures of Huckleberry Finn
The Adventures of Pow Wow
The Adventures of Robinson Crusoe
Adventures of Sonic the Hedgehog
The Adventures of Teddy Ruxpin
The Adventures of Tintin
Albert the 5th Musketeer
All Dogs Go to Heaven: The Series
Around the World in 80 Days
Around the World in 80 Dreams
Alvin and the Chipmunks
Avenger Penguins
Babar
Baby Bollies
The Baby Huey Show
Batman: The Animated Series
Beast Wars: Transformers
Bigfoot and the Muscle Machines
Billy the Cat
The Black Corsair
Blinky Bill's Extraordinary Excursion
Bob in a Bottle
Bob the Builder
Bozo: The World's Most Famous Clown
BraveStarr
The Bubblies
Bucky O'Hare and the Toad Wars!
Bugs Bunny
Bugs Bunny and Friends
Capitol Critters
Captain America
Captain Planet and the Planeteers
Captain Pugwash
Captain Star
Captain Zed and the Zee Zone
The Care Bears
Casper and Friends
Casper the Friendly Ghost
Cédric
Challenge of the GoBots
Chip 'n Dale: Rescue Rangers
Choppy and the Princess
Cococinel
Code Lyoko
Colonel Bleep
Conan and the Young Warriors
Conan the Adventurer
C.O.P.S.
Cro
Count Duckula
C.L.Y.D.E.
Danger Mouse
Darkwing Duck
Defenders of the Earth
Dennis the Menace
Denver, the Last Dinosaur
Detective Bogey
Dexter's Laboratory
Dinosaucers
Dino-Riders
Disney's Adventures of the Gummi Bears
DoDo, The Kid from Outer Space
Dog City
Dogtanian and the Three Muskehounds
Donald Duck
Double Dragon
Dragon Ball Z
Dragon Flyz
Dragon Hunters
Dragon Tales
The Dreamstone
DuckTales
Dungeons & Dragons
Eckhart
Ed, Edd n Eddy
Eggzavier the Eggasaurus
Enid Blyton's Enchanted Lands
Extreme Ghostbusters
Fables of the Green Forest
Fairy Tale Police Department
Fat Albert and the Cosby Kids
Felix the Cat
Ferdy the Ant
The Flintstones
Flipper and Lopaka
The Flying House
Funky Fables
Freaky Stories
The Fruitties
The Funny Company
Galactik Football
Galtar and the Golden Lance
George of the Jungle
The Giddy Game Show
The Greedysaurus Gang
Grimm's Fairy Tale Classics
Gustavus
G.I. Joe Extreme
G.I. Joe: A Real American Hero
G.I. Joe: A Real American Hero
Hammerman
Hey Arnold!
He-Man and the Masters of the Universe
Highlander: The Animated Series
The Houndcats
Hoyt'n Andy's Sportsbender
Hurricanes
Iggy Arbuckle
Inhumanoids
Inspector Gadget
Jackie Chan Adventures
The Jackson 5ive
Jana of the Jungle
Jem
Johnny Bravo
The Jungle Book
Kimba the White Lion
Kim Possible
King
The King Kong Show
Knights of the Zodiac
Kong: The Animated Series
Laurel & Hardy
Legend of the Dragon
The Legend of White Fang
Leo the Lion 
The Lion King's Timon & Pumbaa
Little Hippo
The Little Mermaid
The Little Rascals
The Littl' Bits
Lucky Luke
Looney Tunes
Madeline
The Magical Adventures of Quasimodo
The Magical World of Gigi
The Magician
The Magic School Bus
Magica and the Puzzle Plaza
Maple Town
The Marvel Super Heroes
Master Raindrop
Maya the Honey Bee
Mega Man
Men in Black: The Animated Series
Mickey Mouse
The Mighty Hercules
Mister T
Monster by Mistake
Moomin
Mr. Magoo
Muppet Babies
My Little Pony 'n Friends
My Little Pony Tales
My Pet Monster
Nanook's Great Hunt
The New Adventures of Winnie the Pooh
The New Adventures of Zorro
New Kids on the Block
Noddy's Toyland Adventures
The Noozles
Nudnik
Once Upon a Time
Once Upon a Time... Life
Once Upon a Time... The Americas
Ox Tales
Paddington
Painted Tales
Papa Beaver's Storytime
Phantom Investigators
Pingu
The Pink Panther Show
Pinky and the Brain
Police Academy
Popeye
Popeye and Son
The Powerpuff Girls
The Power Team
Princesse Shéhérazade
Project G.e.e.K.e.R.
Professor Balthazar
The Proud Family
The Raccoons
The Raggy Dolls
The Real Ghostbusters
ReBoot
Redbeard
Regal Academy 
Ring Raiders
The Road Runner Show
Robinson Sucroe
Robotech
Roger Ramjet
Rude Dog and the Dweebs
Rugrats
Rupert
Saban's Adventures of Peter Pan
Saban's Adventures of Pinocchio
Saber Rider and the Star Sheriffs
Samurai Pizza Cats
Samurai X
Sandokan
Scooby-Doo, Where Are You!
Sea Dogs
She-Ra: Princess of Power
The Silver Brumby
Simba: The King Lion
The Simpsons
Skyland
Slim Pig
The Smoggies
The Smurfs
Sonic the Hedgehog
Spartakus & the Sun Beneath the Sea
Spider Riders
Spider-Man
Spiff and Hercules
Spiral Zone
Staines Down Drains
Stone Protectors
Street Football
Supa Strikas
Super Chicken
Super Dave: Daredevil for Hire
Super Mario Bros.
Superbook
SuperTed
Swamp Thing
TaleSpin
Tarzan, Lord of the Jungle
Taz-Mania
Teenage Mutant Ninja Turtles
Three Little Ghosts
ThunderCats
Thundersub
Tic Tac Toons
Tifu
Toad Patrol
Tom and Jerry
Tom & Jerry Kids
Tom Slick
Tombik & B.B. Show
The Transformers
The Triplets
Tupu
The Ugly Duckling and Me!
Ultimate Book of Spells
The Undersea Adventures of Captain Nemo
Victor & Hugo: Bunglers in Crime
Video Power
Visionaries: Knights of the Magical Light
Voltron: Defender of the Universe
Wacky Races
Watership Down
What About Mimi?
What's New, Mr. Magoo?
Where's Wally?
Widget
Wild C.A.T.s
William's Wish Wellingtons
Winx Club
Wolves, Witches and Giants
The World of Peter Rabbit and Friends
X-Men
Zeke's Pad
Zoe and Charlie

Talk Shows
The Ellen DeGeneres Show
Teen Scene

Drama
21 Jump Street
24
The A-Team
Acapulco H.E.A.T.
The Adventures of the Black Stallion
Andromeda
Beverly Hills, 90210
Boston Legal
Coronet Blue
Criminal Minds
The Crow: Stairway to Heaven
Dark Angel
Danger Man
Desperate Housewives
Doctor Who
Dr. Finlay's Casebook
ER
Fame
Fame L.A.
The Flash
Flipper
Friday the 13th: The Series
Hardcastle and McCormick
Hawkeye
Hercules: The Legendary Journeys
The House of Elliot
Jacob's Cross
Journey to the West
Katts and Dog
Knight Rider
Kung Fu
The Legend of the Hidden City
The Legend of William Tell
Lie Down with Lions
L.A. Heat
MacGyver
Magnum, P.I.
Martial Law
Miami Sands
Miami Vice
Moonlighting
Mr. Novak
Murder, She Wrote
Mutant X
Night Man
North of 60
Pacific Blue
The Pallisers
Queen of Swords
Robocop: The Series
Salem's Lot
Sonny Spoon
Stargate SG-1
Suburban Bliss
Tales of the South Seas
Tarzan
This Life
Thunder in Paradise
T. J. Hooker
V
Viper
Walker, Texas Ranger
Xena: Warrior Princess

Comedy
3rd Rock from the Sun
'Allo 'Allo!
ALF
All of Us
The Bob Morrison Show
Boogies Diner
The Cosby Show
The Dukes of Hazzard
Family Matters
Fawlty Towers
The Fresh Prince of Bel-Air
The Golden Girls
Hangin' with Mr. Cooper
Keeping Up Appearances
Kids Say the Darndest Things
The Love Boat
Madam & Eve
Minor Adjustments
The Melting Pot
My Wife and Kids
One Foot in the Grave
One on One
Roseanne
Sabrina, the Teenage Witch
Sanford and Son

Documentary
Mysteries, Magic and Miracles
Rescue 911

Soap Opera
All My Children
A Country Practice
Dallas
Dynasty
Falcon Crest
Melrose Place
Neighbours
Passions
Santa Barbara
Sunset Beach

Anthology
The Twilight Zone

Education
Encyclopædia Britannica

Military
Tour of Duty

Game Shows
The Crystal Maze

Variety
Hollywood A Go-Go
Keeping Up With The Kardashians
Little Women: Atlanta
Little Women: LA
The Mickey Mouse Club
Nightcap

Telenovela
Aurora
Corazón valiente
El fantasma de Elena
La impostora
Mi corazón insiste en Lola Volcán
My 3 Sisters
Pasión prohibida
Santa Diabla

Wrestling
WWF Superstars of Wrestling

Studios and location
ZBC TV broadcasts mainly from the studios in Pockets Hill, in a suburb of Highlands, in Harare. It has another studio located in Bulawayo, in a suburb of Montrose.

The broadcasting centre in Pockets Hill was commissioned in 1970, while the new building was commissioned by the former president, Robert Mugabe in 1994.

References

Television in Zimbabwe